Mojo may refer to:
Mojo (African-American culture), a magical charm bag used in voodoo

Arts, entertainment and media

Film and television
MOJO HD, an American television network
Mojo (play), by Jez Butterworth, made into a 1997 film
Mojo (2017 film)
Mojo Jojo, the main villain in The Powerpuff Girls

Games
Mojo (board game)
Mojo! (video game), 2003
Mojo (microconsole), an Android video game console by Mad Catz
Mojo Rules System (RPG), created by Polymancer magazine
Mojo, a character in Chrono Cross

Literature
Mojo (comics), a Marvel Comics villain
Mojo (magazine), a British music magazine
Mother Jones (magazine), colloquially referred to as "MoJo"
Mojo: Conjure Stories, an anthology edited by Nalo Hopkinson

Music

Artists
The Mojos, a 1960s merseybeat group
The Mojo Men, a 1960s San Francisco group

Companies
Mojo Records, a 1990s California record label
Mojo Records (UK), a record label
Mojo (UK record label), founded in 1971
Mojo Concerts, a Dutch subsidiary of Live Nation Entertainment

Radio stations
Mojo Radio (WPLJ), a New York City-based radio station
Mojo Radio (CFMJ), a Toronto, Ontario radio station

Recordings
Mojo (Tom Petty and the Heartbreakers album), 2010
Mojo (Ash Grunwald album), 2019
"Mojo", a 2012 song by -M- from Îl
"Mojo", a 1995 song by Night Ranger from Feeding off the Mojo
"Mojo", a 2006 song by Peeping Tom from Peeping Tom

Sculptures
Mojo (Moeller), a 2008 sculpture

Businesses and organizations
Mojo (advertising), an Australian advertising agency
Mojo Club, in Hamburg, Germany
Mojo Press, a publisher
Mississippi Mojo, a US bandy club
Miscarriages of Justice Organisation or MOJO, a charity

Food 
Mojo (confectionery), a sweet manufactured and sold in the UK
Mojo Pizza, an Indian pizza brand
Mojo (sauce), a group of sauces from the Canary Islands

People with the name

Given name 
Mojo Nixon (born 1957), American musician
Mojo Mathers (born 1966), New Zealand Member of Parliament

Nickname 
George "Mojo" Buford (1929–2011), American blues harmonica player
Mo Johnston (born 1963), or MoJo, footballer
MoJo (born 1952), Japanese vocalist
Maurice Jones-Drew (born 1985), or MoJo, NFL running back
Matt Morginsky (born 1976), or Mojo, former lead singer of The O.C. Supertones 
Mojo Rawley, American wrestler
Mojo, singer, musician, songwriter and leader of Mojo & The Bayou Gypsies, a zydeco and Cajun music band

Places
Mojo, Ethiopia, a railway town near Addis Ababa
An island a few miles west of Mount Tambora in Indonesia
The original name of the site for the Customs clearance facility near Sevington, in Kent, England.

Other uses
Mojo (mobile journalist), a journalist in the field who sends stories electronically
Mojo people, an indigenous people of Bolivia
Mojo languages, spoken in Bolivia
Mahindra Mojo, a motorcycle
Mortimer Jordan High School, or MoJo, in Morris, Alabama
 Mojo, a genus of mammals in the family Haramiyidae

See also 
Box Office Mojo, a motion picture related website

Modjo, a French dance music duo
Moxo (disambiguation)
Moio (disambiguation)
Moyo (disambiguation)